The Lighthouse of Chibata is a multi-use structure water tower and lighthouse in the civil parish of Caparica e Trafaria, municipality of Almada, in the Portuguese district of Setúbal.

History
The construction of the water tank and installation of the light occurred in the 20th century, probably around the 1980s.

Architecture
To the northwest is the Convent of the Capuchos and the Church of Nossa Senhora da Conceição, in addition to the lookout of Capuchos.

The structure is a  water tank, constructed of reinforced concrete painted light yellow, over which is a cylindrical tower of smaller diameter, also in reinforced concrete, but painted like tile or adobe. The tower consists of a circular tube and lighthouse beacon, in addition to various telecommunication antennas. The portion associated with the water tank includes a fenestral radial, with a stone parapet, that includes three levels and decorated in hammered stone with doorway.

References

Notes

Sources
 

Buildings and structures in Almada
Buildings and structures in Setúbal District
Chibata